The following lists events that happened during 1980 in Singapore.

Incumbents
President: Benjamin Henry Sheares 
Prime Minister: Lee Kuan Yew

Events

February
 1 February – The Singapore Broadcasting Corporation is launched, allowing for better programmes to be shown.

May
 1 May – The URA/HDB parking coupon are introduced.

August
 6 August – The Singapore Democratic Party is formed.
 8 August – The National University of Singapore is formed from a merger between then University of Singapore and Nanyang University.

December
 17 December – A new ferry terminal will be built in Sentosa, which will be finished by September 1981.
 23 December – The PAP wins all 75 seats in the 1980 General Election.

Births
 28 January – Hady Mirza, singer, winner of Singapore Idol (Season 2).
 20 June – Alvin Tan, politician.
 25 November – Ng Yi Sheng, writer.
 17 December – Stella Huang, former singer.
 23 December – Elvin Ng, actor.

Deaths
 8 August – Chua Jim Neo, cookbook author and mother of Lee Kuan Yew (b. 1907).
 P. Govindasamy Pillai, businessman (b. 1887).

References

 
Singapore
Years of the 20th century in Singapore
Singapore
1980s in Singapore